Bramhall is a suburban area in the Metropolitan Borough of Stockport, Greater Manchester, England. Historically in Cheshire, it had a population of 17,436 at the 2011 Census.

History
The Anglo-Saxon manor of Bramall was held as separate estates by two Saxon freemen, Brun and Hacun. In 1070, William the Conqueror subdued the north-west of England, and divided the land among his followers. The manor was given to Hamon de Massey, who eventually became the first Baron of Dunham Massey. The earliest reference to Bramall was recorded in the Domesday Book as "Bramale", a name derived from the Old English words brom meaning broom, both indigenous to the area, and halh meaning nook or secret place, probably by water. De Masci received the manor as wasteland, since it had been devastated by William the Conqueror. By the time of the Domesday survey, the land was recovering and cultivated again.

In 1875, Bramhall was one of eight civil parishes of Cheshire to be included in the Stockport Rural rural sanitary district. The sanitary district became the Stockport Rural District in 1894. The parish was abolished in 1900 and its former area became part of the Hazel Grove and Bramhall civil parish and urban district. In 1974, the district was abolished, under the Local Government Act 1972, and transferred to Greater Manchester to be combined with that of other districts to form the Metropolitan Borough of Stockport.

Governance
Bramhall is part of the parliamentary constituency of Cheadle, represented by Conservative Mary Robinson since 2015.

Landmarks

In 2016 an extensive programme of restoration work was completed. The Ladybrook flows through the park towards Cheadle and Bramall Hall.

The war memorial commemorates the deaths of 89 men killed in the two world wars.

Churches

The Church of England parish church of St Michael and All Angels in Robins Lane was consecrated in 1911 when Bramhall Parish was created, although the building was not completed until 1963. It replaced an earlier mission church opened in 1890.

Other churches in Bramhall include the Methodist Church near the centre of the village, the United Reformed Church located on Bramhall Lane South, the Baptist Church located on Woodford Road, the Catholic Church of St. Vincent de Paul on Handley Road and Ford's Lane Evangelical Church.

Recreation
Bramhall has a cricket club and there are three lawn tennis clubs (LTC): Bramhall Queensgate LTC, to the north; Bramhall Lane LTC, close to the village; and Bramhall Park LTC, close to the park. There are also two golf clubs in Bramhall, each with 18-hole courses: Bramhall Golf Club and Bramall Park Golf Club. Stockport RUFC in Bramhall has been host to Headlander Festival. There is a recreation centre linked with Bramhall High School with indoor and outdoor facilities.

Transport
Bramhall railway station is on the main line from Manchester to London, via Macclesfield and Stoke-on-Trent. Local trains stop every hour Monday-Saturday on their way to/from Manchester Piccadilly and Stoke-on-Trent; there is a much reduced service on Sunday.

Buses link Bramhall to Manchester (42B), Stockport (378/9), Cheadle Hulme (42B,307/8), Woodford (42B), Parrs Wood (42B) and Hazel Grove (307/8).

Housing
Bramhall's property market is dominated by detached and semi-detached properties with a small part being made up of terraced homes and flats. Many footballers live in Bramhall, highlighting it as a desirable suburban location.

Alongside numerous listed buildings, the sixties and early seventies saw a growth in Bramhall's housing stock. New developments included the Parkside and New House Farm areas in the north of Bramhall and the Dairyground estate which features a co-operative, apartments and a care home. The Dairyground estate is served by Stagecoach Manchester and is in close proximity to Bramhall railway station. Bramhall High School is situated in the Dairyground estate, which is part of the Bramhall North Ward.

Little Australia
The area of Little Australia (so called as all the roads are named after towns in Australia) is bordered by the West Coast Main Line to the north, the Bramhall oil terminal to the east, Bramhall village centre to the west and Moorend Golf Club to the south. The longest road in Little Australia is Meadway, which starts in Bramhall shopping centre and runs through the heart of the estate for its entire length. Meadway has a number of shops, care homes and two large car parking facilities which are served by multiple CCTV cameras. There is also a recycling centre situated on the Meadway East car park. Lumb Lane park is located on the estate and consists of two football pitches, a small children's playground and a hard surface football/basketball court. Bramhall Village Hall is located on Lumb Lane. Queensgate Primary School is located on Albany Road. Little Australia is part of the Bramhall South Ward.

New House Farm 
The New House Farm area is to the north of Bramhall and extends into Hazel Grove after crossing the Fred Perry Way. It is home to a McColl's newsagent and a pub, the Shady Oak. The main roads through New House Farm are Grange Road, which links to Bramhall Lane South, and Ringmore Road. New House Farm is served by the 374 bus route between Hazel Grove Station and Reddish. The New House Farm area contains a section of the Fred Perry Way joining the estate from Bridge Lane and exiting up into Woodsmoor. This area is part of the Bramhall North Ward.

Education
Bramhall has five primary schools: Ladybrook, Moss Hey, Nevill Road, Pownall Green and Queensgate. Bramhall High School is the local secondary school.

Notable people
Notable local residents have included:
 Ronnie Barker, actor and comedian, worked in a repertory company in Bramhall early in his career.
 Peter Barkworth, actor
 George Best, former Manchester United football player
 Steve Bruce, football manager and former Manchester United footballer, lived off Robins Lane
 Peter Butterworth, comedy actor and comedian
 Bradley Dack, footballer 
 Sacha Dhawan, actor, born in Bramhall
 Lauren Drummond, actress, attended Bramhall High School 
 Keith Fielding, former England and Great Britain international rugby player 
 Yvette Fielding, actress and Blue Peter presenter
 Phil Foden, Manchester City footballer
 Martin Fry, lead singer of the band ABC 
 Mark Hadfield, actor, born in Bramhall
 Sarah Harding, singer in the girl group Girls Aloud
 Dame Wendy Hiller, actress, born in Bramhall
 Paul Ince, former Manchester United footballer
 Jason Manford, comedian, singer, television presenter, radio presenter and actor.
 Uwe Rosler, former Manchester City footballer 
 Kasper Schmeichel, current Leicester City and former Manchester City footballer
 Peter Schmeichel, former Manchester United and Manchester City footballer 
 Ole Gunnar Solskjær, former Manchester United player and former manager, lived in Bramhall whilst a player.
 Ryan Thomas, actor

See also

Listed buildings in Hazel Grove and Bramhall
Ladybrook Valley

External links
 Bramhall United Reformed Church

References

Areas of Greater Manchester
Villages in Greater Manchester
Geography of the Metropolitan Borough of Stockport